Raymond Ndong Sima (born 23 January 1955) is a Gabonese politician who was Prime Minister of Gabon from February 2012 to January 2014.

Career
Ndong Sima was born in Oyem, located in the north of Gabon, and studied in France. He was appointed to the cabinet of the Minister of Planning and the Economy in 1986, where he was assigned responsibility for structural adjustment and relations with the International Monetary Fund and the World Bank. In 1992, he was appointed as Director-General of the Economy; he remained in that post, while simultaneously retaining responsibility for structural adjustment, until 1994. He then worked as Director-General of Hévégab, a state-owned rubber company, from 1994 to 1998.

Ndong Sima was appointed to the government as Minister of Agriculture, Livestock, and Rural Development on 17 October 2009.

In the December 2011 parliamentary election, in which the ruling Gabonese Democratic Party (PDG) won an overwhelming majority of seats, Ndong Sima was elected to the National Assembly as a candidate in Kyé, located in Woleu-Ntem Province.

Prime Minister Paul Biyoghe Mba resigned on 13 February 2012. President Ali Bongo then appointed Ndong Sima as Prime Minister on 27 February 2012. His appointment was considered noteworthy in that traditionally the post of Prime Minister was given to an ethnic Fang from Estuaire Province, while Ndong Sima was from Woleu-Ntem Province in the north—although he was also a Fang. Prior to his appointment, Ndong Sima had not been considered a particularly important figure on the political scene.

Ndong Sima served as Prime Minister for nearly two years. Following local elections in December 2013, President Bongo appointed Daniel Ona Ondo to replace Ndong Sima on 24 January 2014. Ona Ondo took office at a handover ceremony with Ndong Sima on 27 January.

In July 2015, Ndong Sima quit the PDG, complaining that the party was not open to criticism and different points of view. He also criticized the government's handling of finances since he left office. PDG Secretary-General Faustin Boukoubi responded that Ndong Sima was an opportunist and insisted that the PDG was internally democratic.

References

1955 births
Fang people
Gabonese Democratic Party politicians
Living people
People from Oyem
Prime Ministers of Gabon
Members of the National Assembly of Gabon
21st-century Gabonese people